Dil-e-Jaanam is a Pakistani television series that first aired on 1 March 2017 on Hum TV. It features Zahid Ahmed and Hina Altaf in leads. It was given Wednesdays 8:00 pm slot but due to low rating and after 7 episodes, it was switched to Fridays at 8:00 p.m., giving way to Yaqeen Ka Safar. Due to the low ratings channel decided to off-air the series. The last episode was aired 21 July 2017.

Plot
Two cousins, Eshal (Hina Altaf Khan) and Shavez (Zahid Ahmed), are engaged from childhood. But conditions change, when Shavez starts taking interest in a girl, Asma (Zhalay Sarhadi). His parents, Rabiya (Shaheen Khan) and Rehman (Usman Peerzada) are unaware of fact and prepare to marry Shavez with his maternal uncle Usman (Anwar Iqbal)'s daughter Eshal. While, Eshal has a friend Haris (Imran Ashraf), who helps her with all types of problems.  Eshal does not have feelings for him but he loves her. On the wedding day, Shavez does his nikah with Asma and expresses his love for her in front of his parents. His parents are shocked to see them. A devastated Rabiya goes to apologize to her brother and sister-in-law . But they say her that it is not her fault.  Shortly thereafter, Eshal’s parents arrange her wedding with someone else but the day before her wedding she is kidnapped.  Shortly before being released Haris reveals his face to Eshal as he wants to threaten her and her family should she try to marry anyone else or tell anyone it was him that had her kidnapped.  Everyone is oblivious of the fact that Haris had kidnapped her and are happy that Eshal is found.

Cast 

 Zahid Ahmed as Shavez 
 Hina Altaf as Eshal
 Usman Peerzada as Rehman
 Imran Ashraf as Haris
 Zhalay Sarhadi as Asma
 Saba Faisal as Qudsia
 Shaheen Khan as Rabiya
 Anwar Iqbal as Azeem
 Shamim Hilaly as Rakshy
 Zarnab as salma
 Iqra Aziz as Sameera; Cameo
 Sabahat 
 Mehreen
 Sofia Khan
 Aashiq Khan
 Kamal Khan

Production 
On being asked about her character on this project and why she chose to play it, Zhalay shared,
"My character is called Asma, she is a career driven woman who is very egoistical and is used to getting what she wants. She is also a woman in love and the combination of the two is deadly. I love doing challenging characters which have many shades. Asma is a real woman with true emotions and not just a symbol of evil or good. I was intrigued by the various colors in her personality and that is what drew me to this play".

See also

 List of programs broadcast by Hum TV
 Zara Yaad Kar

References

External links 
 Official Website
 

Pakistani drama television series
2017 Pakistani television series debuts
2017 Pakistani television series endings
Urdu-language television shows
Hum TV original programming